Richard Thomas Flaherty (August 8, 1900 – February 4, 1984) was an American football end for the Green Bay Packers of the National Football League (NFL). He played college football for Gonzaga and Marquette.

Biography
Flaherty was born on August 8, 1900, in Seattle, Washington. He died on February 4, 1984, at Sacred Heart Medical Center in Spokane, Washington.

Career
Flaherty played with the Green Bay Packers during the 1926 NFL season. He played at the collegiate level at Marquette University and Gonzaga University.

See also
List of Green Bay Packers players

References

1900 births
1984 deaths
Players of American football from Seattle
Green Bay Packers players
Marquette University alumni
Gonzaga University alumni
Marquette Golden Avalanche football players
Gonzaga Bulldogs football players